Imidoyl chlorides are organic compounds that contain the functional group RC(NR')Cl.  A double bond exist between the R'N and the carbon centre.  These compounds are analogues of acyl chloride. Imidoyl chlorides tend to be highly reactive and are more commonly found as intermediates in a wide variety of synthetic procedures. Such procedures include Gattermann aldehyde synthesis, Houben-Hoesch ketone synthesis, and the Beckmann rearrangement. Their chemistry is related to that of enamines and their tautomers when the α hydrogen is next to the C=N bond.  Many chlorinated N-heterocycles are formally imidoyl chlorides, e.g. 2-chloropyridine, 2, 4, and 6-chloropyrimidines.

Synthesis and properties
Imidoyl halides are synthesized by combining amides and halogenating agents.  The structure of the carboxylic acid amides plays a role in the outcome of the synthesis. Imidoyl chloride can be prepared by treating a monosubstituted carboxylic acid amide with phosgene.
RC(O)NHR’ + COCl2 → RC(NR’)Cl + HCl + CO2
Thionyl chloride is also used.

Imidoyl chlorides are generally colorless liquids or low-melting solids that are sensitive to both heat and especially moisture. In their IR spectra these compounds exhibit a  characteristic νC=N band near 1650–1689 cm−1. Although both the syn and anti configurations are possible, most imidoyl chlorides adopt the anti configuration.

Reactivity 
Imidoyl chlorides react readily with water, hydrogen sulfide, amines, and hydrogen halides. Treating imidoyl chlorides with water forms the corresponding amide:

RC(NR’)Cl + H2O → RCONHR’ + HCl

Aliphatic imidoyl chlorides are more sensitive toward hydrolysis than aryl derivatives. Electron-withdrawing substituents decrease the reaction rate.  Imidoyl chlorides react with hydrogen sulfide to produce thioamides:
RC(NR’)Cl + H2S → RC(S)NHR’ + HCl

When amines are treated with imidoyl chlorides, amidines are obtained.

RC(NR’)Cl + 2R”NH2 → RC(NR’)NHR” + R”NH3Cl
When R' ≠ R", two isomers are possible.

Upon heating, imidoyl chlorides also undergo dehydrohalogenation to form nitriles:

RC(NR’)Cl → RC≡N + R’Cl

Treatment of imidoyl chloride with hydrogen halides, such as HCl, forms the corresponding iminium chloride cations:

RC(NR’)Cl + HCl → [RC(NHR’)Cl]+Cl−

Applications 
Imidoyl chlorides are useful intermediates in the syntheses of several compounds, including imidates, thioimidates, amidines, and imidoyl cyanides. Most of these syntheses involve replacing the chloride with alcohols, thiols, amines, and cyanates, respectively. Imidoyl chlorides can also undergo Friedel-Crafts reactions to install an imine groups on aromatic substrates. If the nitrogen of the imidoyl chloride has two substituents, the resulting chloroiminium ion is vulnerable to attack by aromatic rings without the need for a Lewis acid to remove the chloride first. This reaction is called the Vilsmeier–Haack reaction, and the chloroiminium ion is referred to as the Vilsmeier reagent.  After attaching the iminium ion to the ring, the functional group can later be hydrolyzed to a carbonyl for further modification. The Vilsmeier-Haack reaction can be a useful technique to add functional groups to an aromatic ring if the ring contains electron-withdrawing groups, which make using the alternative Friedel-Crafts reaction difficult.

Imidoyl chlorides can be easily halogenated at the α carbon position. By treating imidoyl chlorides with hydrogen halide, will cause all α hydrogens to be replaced with the halide. This method can be an effective way to halogenate many substances. Imidoyl chlorides can also be used to form peptide bonds by first creating amidines and then allowing them to be hydrolyzed to the amide. This approach may prove to be a useful route to synthesizing synthetic proteins.

Imidoyl chlorides can be difficult to handle. Imidoyl chlorides react readily with water, which makes any attempt to isolate and store them for long periods of time difficult. Further, imidoyl chlorides tend to undergo self-condensation at higher temperatures if the imidoyl chloride has an α CH group. At even higher temperatures, the chlorine of the imidoyl chloride tends to be eliminated, leaving the nitrile. Because of these complications, imidoyl chlorides are typically prepared and used immediately. More stable intermediates are being sought, with substances such as imidoylbenzotriazoles being suggested.

References 

Functional groups
Organochlorides